Duchsustus (from Greek  dyschistos) is the name of a type of parchment used for religious writings in Judaism. It is originally a Greek word and one of three Talmudic names for animal skin. The meanings of these terms, however, are the subject of controversy in Jewish law.

Jewish law and rituals
Talmud
Writing media
Uses of leather in Judaism
Greek words and phrases in Jewish law